The Black Bauhinia flag is a variant of the flag of Hong Kong with a black background and (in most versions) a modified flower. The flag gained popularity during the 2019–2020 Hong Kong protests and is often displayed by pro-democracy protesters.

Design 
There are three main variants of the design: the basic design, which simply swaps out the red background for black; a variant of the black flag where a few petals are withered; and a variant of the withered flag where the petals are also bloodstained. The latter two designs also omit the stars in the petals that symbolize the People's Republic of China.

Usage 

The flag was displayed during the storming and occupation of the Legislative Council chamber by protesters on 1 July 2019. The People's Republic of China flags outside the building and at Golden Bauhinia Square were lowered, and the bloodstained variants of the Black Bauhinia were raised in their place. The Hong Kong flags were also lowered to half-mast as a sign of mourning. Five days later on 6 July, the Black Bauhinia was raised at the Cenotaph.

Copyright 
Hong Kong customs and police consider the flag to be a violation of the Regional Flag Act and a potential trademark violation. Some lawyers, including the barrister Albert Luk, argue that the flag does not meet the specifications of the Regional Flag Act and contravenes the People's Republic of China Flag Law. However, Luk was also of the opinion that the source of the flag cannot be reliably traced without sufficient evidence, and as such, legal action cannot be taken.

Ukrainian Ministry of Defence video 
The Chinese and Hong Kong governments criticised the Ukrainian Ministry of Defence for including the Black Bauhinia flag in a video it posted on Twitter on 18 December 2022. In the video, the Ukrainian government thanked the foreign volunteers in the international legion for fighting against invading Russian forces. The video featured a collage of flags corresponding to the volunteers' nationalities, including the Black Bauhinia flag. The Chinese foreign ministry responded by asking Ukraine to refrain from showing support to "anti-China forces in Hong Kong".

See also 
 Liberate Hong Kong, revolution of our times

References 

2019–2020 Hong Kong protests
Flags of Hong Kong
Flags introduced in 2019
Unofficial flags